Noah Timothy Verhoeven (born June 15, 1999) is a Canadian professional soccer player who plays for Atlético Ottawa in the Canadian Premier League.

Early life
Verhoeven played youth soccer with Surrey United SC from 2007 to 2011, with whom he won a district championship in 2009-10 and served as team camp. In 2009 and 2010, he also played with Guru Nanak Sporting Club and from 2007 to 2010, he trained with the Total Soccer Systems (TSS) Academy. From 2009 to 2011, Verhoeven was a member of Whitecaps FC Prospects program and joined the official Whitecaps FC Academy in September 2011.

Club career
In October 2017, he joined USL side Whitecaps FC 2, as an academy callup. He made his professional debut on October 7, 2017 in a 1–1 draw against Real Monarchs SLC, coming on as a substitute in the 74th minute.

In March 2018, he joined Fresno FC in the USL, who became the Whitecaps USL affiliate following the disbanding of the Whitecaps second team, signing his first professional contract. Later that month, he made his debut for the team. On April 18, 2018, he recorded his first assist in a 2-2 draw against the Tulsa Roughnecks.

In January 2019, he signed with Pacific FC of the Canadian Premier League. He made his debut in the club's inaugural match on on April 28, recording an assist against HFX Wanderers FC off of a corner kick. In early May 2019, he was named the CPL U23 Player of the Week. He was named to the CPL Spring season Best XI, after the first part of the 2019 season. In December 2019, he re-signed with the club for the 2020 season.

In February 2021. he joined York United in the Canadian Premier League. He signed a two year contract with a club option for a third season. In December 2022, Verhoeven's contract option was not picked up by York, ending his time at the club.

In February 2023, he joined Atlético Ottawa on a two-year contract.

International career
Verhoeven is a dual citizen of Canada and the United States, and has Dutch ancestry.

In November 2013, he made his debut in the Canadian youth program at an identification camp for the Canada U15 team. In September 2014, he was named to an official camp for the Canada U15s.

In January 2017, Verhoeven was called up to a camp for the United States U18 team. In 2018, he was called up to the United States U20 team.

In May 2018, he was named to the Canada U21 squad for the 2018 Toulon Tournament. He made his debut on May 28 against Portugal U21, coming on as a substitute. He was then named to the Canadian U20 team for the 2018 CONCACAF U-20 Championship and was named team captain. He was selected was selected to represented Canada U23 at the 2020 CONCACAF Men's Olympic Qualifying Championship, but the tournament was postponed until 2021.

In June 2019, he was called up to train with the Canada senior team for a training camp.

References

External links

1999 births
Living people
Association football forwards
Canadian soccer players
Soccer people from British Columbia
People from Surrey, British Columbia
Canadian people of American descent
Canadian people of Dutch descent
Whitecaps FC 2 players
Fresno FC players
Pacific FC players
York United FC players
Atlético Ottawa players
USL Championship players
Canadian Premier League players
Canada men's youth international soccer players